Jacqueline Gadsden (August 3, 1900 – August 10, 1986) was an American film actress during the silent era. A native of Southern California, she was born in Lompoc to Gerald F. and Jessie H. (Salter) Gadsden and is probably best known to modern audiences as the wealthy, haughty other woman in the 1927 Clara Bow vehicle It. She married William Harry Dale (1900–1975) about 1924. She portrayed Lon Chaney's character's wife in Tod Browning's West of Zanzibar in 1928. In a number of films she was billed as Jacqueline Gadsdon and made two films under the name Jane Daly in 1929, her final year in film. She died in the San Diego County city of San Marcos a week after her 86th birthday.

Partial filmography

Cordelia the Magnificent (1923)
Skid Proof (1923)
Big Dan (1923)
The Man Who Won (1923)
A Chapter in Her Life (1923)
The Goldfish (1924)
His Hour (1924) - Tatiana Shebanoff
The Wife of the Centaur (1924)
The Flaming Forties (1924)
Man and Maid (1924)
Ridin' the Wind (1925)
The Merry Widow (1925)
The Show (1927)
It (1927)
The Thirteenth Hour (1927)
Beyond London Lights (1928)
 The City of Purple Dreams (1928)
Red Hair (1928)
West of Zanzibar (1928)
City of Purple Dreams (1928)
 A Bit of Heaven (1928)
Forbidden Hours (1928)
Beyond London Lights (1928)
The Bellamy Trial (1929)
The Quitter (1929)
The Mysterious Island (1929)

References

External links

1900 births
1986 deaths
American film actresses
People from Lompoc, California
20th-century American actresses
Burials at Forest Lawn Memorial Park (Glendale)
Actresses from California